Montagny-lès-Seurre (literally Montagny near Seurre) is a commune in the Côte-d'Or department in eastern France.

Population

See also
Communes of the Côte-d'Or department

References

Gallery 

Communes of Côte-d'Or